Bislig Airport (Surigaonon: Tugpahanan sang Bislig)  is an airport serving the general area of Bislig, located in the province of Surigao del Sur in the Philippines. The airport is classified as a community airport by the Civil Aviation Authority of the Philippines, a body of the Department of Transportation that is responsible for the operations of not only this airport but also of all other airports in the Philippines except the major international airports.

See also
List of airports in the Philippines

References

External links

Airports in the Philippines
Bislig
Buildings and structures in Surigao del Sur
Transportation in Mindanao